The Moose River is a river in Mount Robson Provincial Park of British Columbia.  It is the first "river" tributary of the Fraser, entering the Fraser just above the inlet to Moose Lake, which is along the course of the Fraser and not the Moose.

Course
Resplendent Creek was once known as the West Fork Moose River. The river then turns southeast again for another . The last  of the river’s course is spent running southwest, under the Yellowhead Highway and into the Fraser shortly after.

Rainbow Canyon
Its mouth is located about 0.4 upstream from the Moose River Bridge along the Yellowhead Highway.

Tributaries
Campion Creek
Steppe Creek
Upright Creek
Colonel Creek
Arctomys Creek
Resplendent Creek
McNaughton Creek

See also
List of British Columbia rivers
Arctomys Cave

References

Rivers of British Columbia
Tributaries of the Fraser River
Robson Valley
Rivers of the Canadian Rockies
Mount Robson Provincial Park